Chou Ching-yu (born 12 June 1944) is a Taiwanese politician.

Political career
Chou served in the National Assembly from 1981 to 1992. In her first electoral win, she earned the highest number of total votes. She achieved a similar milestone in her 1986 reelection campaign, claiming 125,283 votes, most in the district of Taipei. In May, Chou and Hsu Jung-shu were invited to the United States and addressed the US Congressional Committee for Democracy on Taiwan. 

Chou served as magistrate of Changhua County from 1989 to 1993 and was a member of the Taiwan Provincial Consultative Council between 1994 and 1998. She was elected to the Legislative Yuan via party list proportional representation later that year, but won reelection by running for a district seat in 2001. As a lawmaker, she supported environmentalism and women's rights. In 2004, Chou proposed a bill to offer a more stringent legal definition of unwelcome sexual contact. The next year, she backed a bill that mandated the use of tracking technology on paroled sex offenders. Chou also proposed initiatives to lessen employment discrimination against people with mental health problems. Shortly before stepping down from the Legislative Yuan at the end of her term in 2005, Chou  announced that she was running for the party leadership, a position that eventually went to Su Tseng-chang. Subsequently, Chou was named to the Presidium of the fourth National Assembly, representing the Democratic Progressive Party. She also served on the DPP's Central Standing Committee. By 2008, Chou had become president of the Taiwan Coalition Against Violence. From this position, she advocated for awareness of domestic violence against women, and supported a wage increase for social workers. By 2014, Chou was the director-general of the Taiwanese Mother Language League.

Personal life
Chou is married to Yao Chia-wen.

References

1944 births
Living people
Politicians of the Republic of China on Taiwan from Tainan
Changhua County Members of the Legislative Yuan
Members of the 3rd Legislative Yuan
Party List Members of the Legislative Yuan
Members of the 4th Legislative Yuan
Democratic Progressive Party Members of the Legislative Yuan
21st-century Taiwanese women politicians
Magistrates of Changhua County
20th-century Taiwanese judges